Tomas Hilifa Rainhold (actually Reinhardt Thomas, born 7 February 1991), is a Namibian long-distance runner. He competed in the men's marathon at the 2019 World Athletics Championships held in Doha, Qatar. He finished in 17th place.

In 2018, he competed in the men's half marathon at the IAAF World Half Marathon Championships held in Valencia, Spain. He finished in 111th place.

In 2021, he competed at the Xiamen Marathon and Tuscany Camp Global Elite Race in Siena, Italy. He finished 28th in 2:10:24, a personal best. This performance qualified him for the men's marathon at the 2020 Summer Olympics in Tokyo, Japan.

He competed at the 2022 Commonwealth Games where he finished 13th in the men's marathon event.

References

External links 
 

Living people
1991 births
Place of birth missing (living people)
Namibian male long-distance runners
Namibian male marathon runners
World Athletics Championships athletes for Namibia
Athletes (track and field) at the 2020 Summer Olympics
Olympic athletes of Namibia
Commonwealth Games competitors for Namibia
Athletes (track and field) at the 2022 Commonwealth Games
20th-century Namibian people
21st-century Namibian people